The coat of arms of the Sakha Republic (Saqa Öröspüübülüketin caralıga; , Gerb Respubliki Sakha), in the Russian Federation, is an official symbol of the Sakha Republic, alongside the flag and the national anthem of the Sakha Republic. The coat of arms consists of a circle, in the center of which is a red silhouette of a rider on horseback holding a banner, based on the prehistoric petroglyphs of the "Shishkin pisanitsa", against a white sun background. The central image is framed with a traditional Sakha ornament in the form of seven rhombic crystal-like figures and the inscriptions "Республика Саха (Якутия) • Саха Өрөспүүбүлүкэтэ". This coat of arms has been used officially since 26 December 1992.

Prior to 1992, the Sakha Republic existed as the Yakut Autonomous Soviet Socialist Republic. Prior to 1937, Yakut ASSR used a coat of arms with the basis of korenizatsiya, on which it contained the depiction of the Lena River, Aurora, and the name of the ASSR. After 1937, the coat of arms of the Yakut ASSR is identical with the emblem of the Russian SFSR.

Symbolism 
The central element of the coat of arms is an image of an ancient rider with a banner. The image was one of the rock paintings found near the village of Shishkino in 1745 by members of the Great Northern Expedition of the Russian Academy of Sciences. The painting was believed to be made by Kurykans. Scientists believe that the rider depicted in the painting are the leaders of the clans and tribes of the Kurykans. The red banner in the image symbolized the unity and the strength of the Kurykan tribes.

The seven rhombic crystal-like figures of faceted diamonds symbolizes one of the natural resources of the republic. The amount of the faceted diamonds also symbolizes the unity of the peoples living in Yakutia : Yakuts, Russians, Evenks, Evens, Chukchi, Dolgans, and Yukagirs.

History

As the Yakutsk Oblast 
The coat of arms of the Yakutsk Oblast was approved on 5 July 1878. The coat of arms consisted of silver shield, with a black eagle holding a scarlet sable in its claws. The shield is decorated with the Tsar's crown and is surrounded by golden oak leaves, intertwined by Alexander's ribbon.

As the Yakut ASSR 

The first emblem of the Yakut ASSR was described in the 1926 Constitution of the Yakut ASSR, which was approved on the 4th All-Yakutsk Congress of Soviets on 13 February 1926, and was introduced by resolution of the 2nd session of the Yakut Central Executive Committee on the 4th convocation of 17 September 1926. The depiction of the emblem is still unknown.

The emblem of the Yakut ASSR was described in the 1937 Constitution of the Yakut ASSR, which was adopted by the Central Executive Committee of the Yakut ASSR on 9 March 1937, at the 9th Extraordinary Congress of Soviets of the Yakut ASSR. The emblem was the same with the emblem of the Russian SFSR. The only difference was some additional inscriptions. These inscriptions changed after a new alphabet for the Yakut language was approved by a decree of the People's Commissar of Education of the Soviet Union.

Some additions was enacted after the adoption of the new constitution of the Yakut ASSR on 31 May 1978. A red star with yellow border was added to the top of the emblem, and the position of the inscriptions was re-arranged.

As the Sakha (Yakut) Republic 

On 4 April 1992, the Sakha Republic adopted a new constitution. The coat of arms of the Sakha Republic had not been made, so the constitution only states that :

The description of the coat of arms was approved and was inserted into the Constitution of the Sakha Republic by the amendments of 22 July 2008.

Word change 
In June 2016, the government enacted a word change of the word "Republic" in the Yakut language. The Yakut word for Republic, Республиката, was changed into Өрөспүүбүлүкэтэ. This change affected the inscriptions on the coat of arms.

On 15 June 2016, to officially adopt this change of word, the constitution was amended, and on 25 October 2016, the inscription on the coat of arms was changed by the Law "On the Official Symbols of the Republic of Sakha (Yakutia)".

Designers  
Osipov, Afanasy Nikolayevich (born 1928) – painter, People's Artist of the USSR, laureate of the I. Repin State Prize of Russia, Honored Artist of the Sakha Republic, full member of the Russian Academy of Arts. Member of the Union of Artists of the Russian Federation.
Parnikov, Vasily Semenovich (born 1935) – graphic artist, Honored Artist of the Sakha Republic. Member of the Union of Artists of the Russian Federation.
Ignatiev, Vladimir Nikiforovich (born 1948) – graphic artist, designer.
Potapov, Innokenty Afanasyevich (born 1932) – art historian, art history, Honored Artist of the Russian Federation, laureate of the State Prize of the Sakha Republic named after Platon Oyunsky, corresponding member of the Russian Academy of Arts. Member of the Union of Artists of the Russian Federation.

References

Notes

Citations

Bibliography

Constitutions

Books 

Sakha
Sakha Republic